Othmar, (also Audomar, c. 689 – c. 759) was a Medieval monk and priest. He served as the first abbot of the Abbey of St. Gall, a Benedictine monastery near which the town of St. Gallen, now in Switzerland, developed.

Life
Othmar was of Alemannic descent, received his education in Rhaetia, was ordained priest, and for a time presided over a church of St. Florinus in Rhaetia. This church was probably identical with the one of St. Peter at Remus, where Florinus had laboured as a priest and was buried. 

In 720 Waltram of Thurgau appointed Othmar superior over the cell of St. Gall and custodian of Gall's relics. He united into a monastery the monks that lived about the cell of St. Gall, according to the Rule of St. Columban, and became their first abbot. He added a hospital and a school, which became the foundation upon which the famous Stiftsbibliothek (Monastery library) was built. In 747, as a part of the reform movement of Church institutions in Alamannia, he introduced the Benedictine Rule, which was to remain in effect until the secularization and closure of the monastery in 1805. Othmar also provided for the needs of the surrounding community, building an almshouse as well as the first leprosarium in Switzerland.

When Carloman renounced his throne in 747, he visited Othmar at St. Gall and gave him a letter to his brother Pepin, recommending Othmar and his monastery to the king's liberality. Othmar personally brought the letter to Pepin, and was kindly received. 

In 759, Counts Warin and Ruodhart tried to gain possession of some property belonging to St. Gall, Othmar fearlessly resisted their demands. Hereupon they captured him while he was on a journey to Constance, and held him prisoner, first at the castle of Bodmann, then on the island of Werd in the Rhine. At the latter place he died, after an imprisonment of six months, and was buried.

Veneration

Othmar's cult began to spread soon after his death, and next to Maurice and Gall, he is one of the most popular saint in Switzerland. In 769 his body was transferred to the monastery of St. Gall. As the weather was very hot, when the men rowed his body over the lake, they became extremely thirsty. Legends say that the only barrel of wine they had left did not become empty, regardless of how much they drank. Therefore, the wine barrel became one of his attributes.

His cult was officially recognized in 864 by Solomon I (bishop of Constance). In 867 he was solemnly entombed in the new church of St. Othmar at St. Gall. His feast is celebrated on 16 November. He is represented in art as a Benedictine abbot, generally holding a little barrel in his hand, an allusion to the alleged miracle, that a barrel of Othmar never became empty, no matter how much he took from it to give to the poor.

Legacy 
St. Gallen Cathedral is dedicated to Gall and Othmar. St. Othmar chapel on Werd island was erected in his memory.

References 

Abbots of Saint Gall
Swiss Roman Catholic saints
680s births
750s deaths
Year of birth uncertain
Year of death uncertain
8th-century Christian saints
Founders of Catholic religious communities